James Noonan is the name of:

 James L. Noonan (1823–1898), Newfoundland politician
 James P. Noonan (1871–1929), American labor union leader